Calliostoma alboregium is a species of sea snail, a marine gastropod mollusk in the family Calliostomatidae.

Some authors place this taxon in the subgenus Calliostoma (Tristichotrochus)

Description

Distribution
This marine species occurs in the Indo-Pacific.

References

External links

alboregium
Gastropods described in 1961